The following have served as Master of Trinity College, Cambridge:

Masters
Trinity
 List